The 1986 Linfield Wildcats football team was an American football team that represented  Linfield University and won the national championship during the 1986 NAIA Division II football season. In their 19th season under head coach Ad Rutschman, the Wildcats compiled a perfect 12–0 record and won the Columbia Football League (CFL) championship.

Schedule

References

Linfield Wildcats
Linfield Wildcats football seasons
NAIA Football National Champions
College football undefeated seasons
Linfield Wildcats football